CaseIT is an international undergraduate business case competition focused in management information systems. Held annually in Vancouver, British Columbia, this student-organized event focuses on information technology case analysis. Over a span of six days in February, 20 international university teams compete in a 5-hour and 24-hour case deliberation. First round presentations are held in SFU's Harbour Centre campus in Vancouver, while final-round presentations are held in the Segal Graduate School of Business, followed by an Awards Banquet where the top three universities are announced.

History 

Co-founded in 2004 by Paul Cyr and Zephaniah Wong, CaseIT began as a competition between undergraduate teams within Simon Fraser University. Jenny Chao (2005) expanded the competition to incorporate teams from Western Canada, and in the following year, Andrew Kumar drew teams from across Canada. In 2007, Somnath Suresh included teams from the United States and Denmark and in the following year, Rey Lim changed the format into a 24-hour case competition with international teams from Africa and Asia. Steven Chia stabilized the growth of CaseIT in 2009 by formalizing and institutionalizing many processes. Furthering the progression of CaseIT, Nima Sarhangpour played an integral role in the incorporation of the CaseIT Foundation. CaseIT 2012 also saw the first University from Australia take part in the event. CaseIT 2014 saw the addition of the Wildcard Round through Jillian-Joy Marlinga. Gwendoline Wong increased the number of teams competing to 19 team for CaseIT 2015 and combined the Discussion Panel and the Corporate Evening events. In addition, Gwendoline launched InTech, a case competition held parallel to the international competition exclusively for students at Simon Fraser University. With CaseIT 2018, PIVOT, a one-day local ideathon was launched as a way to provide a platform for local students to showcase their skills and talents to the business community. CaseIT 2018 saw the first time roll-out of a two-case competition format as well as the Wildcard round, effectively allowing competitors more opportunities to showcase their skills and knowledge.

Competition

Organizing Committee 

Since its inception, CaseIT has been a student-organized event. Originally consisting of a committee of 16 members, it has since grown to 48 members. The Organizing Committee consists of the Chairs, Vice Chairs, Directors, Coordinators and Team Hosts.

Participants 

Since the competition opened to schools from around the world, CaseIT has hosted university teams from Africa, Asia, Europe, and North America. Some notable participating schools in the past include:

Bocconi University School of Economics 
Tepper School of Business, Carnegie Mellon University
Carlson School of Management, University of Minnesota
Corvinus University of Budapest
Copenhagen Business School
HEC Montreal
John Molson School of Business, Concordia University
Haskayne School of Business, University of Calgary
Hong Kong University of Technology and Science
Kelley School of Business, Indiana University
Kwantlen Polytechnic University
Maastricht University
National University of Singapore
Queen's University, Smith School of Business
Queensland University of Technology
Richard Ivey School of Business, University of Western Ontario
Royal Roads University
Ryerson University (now Toronto Metropolitan University)
Sauder School of Business, University of British Columbia
Singapore Management University
University of Alberta
University of Vermont

Results 

Twenty teams are chosen through an invitational process to participate in the 24-hour case deliberation held in Vancouver. Participants have 24 hours to solve and present their team's solution to a judging panel composed of industry professionals from CaseIT sponsor companies which range in a variety of firms. From these teams, one finalist is chosen from each tier after the first round of presentations. After the final round of presentations, the top three teams are selected by the judging panel. The past results of CaseIT are shown below with the corresponding theme for each year.

Venues 

Venues for CaseIT may change from year-to-year. The following venues are where CaseIT was held in past years.

Morris J. Wosk Centre for Dialogue

Comfortable in its arrangement as an open environment, the hall is home for interaction and dialogue and the site for CaseIT's Discussion Panel. Asia Pacific Hall has hosted heads of states, political leaders, deliberations, and private negotiations since opening in September 2000. The Asia Pacific Hall served as the inspiration for the original CaseIT logo, as the platform where competitors would present.

Vancouver Aquarium

The Corporate Function is held at the Arctic Canada Gallery at the Vancouver Aquarium. Located in Vancouver's Stanley Park, the Vancouver Aquarium was Canada's first public aquarium when it opened in 1956. The Aquarium is dedicated to effecting the conservation of aquatic life through display and interpretation, education, research and direct action. Participants network with one another while watching beluga whales swim by.

Harbour Centre

Simon Fraser University's downtown campus blends history with state-of-the-art educational facilities in one of Vancouver's most famous landmark buildings. After the 24-hour deliberation period, 21 teams present their first round presentations here showcasing their analytical and presentation skills to the CaseIT Judging Panel.

Segal Graduate School of Business

The Segal Graduate School of Business, located in Vancouver's business district, delivers graduate management education and executive programs in a restored heritage building that facilitates discussion and interaction amongst professionals, academics, and students. The top four universities are announced here and present their recommendations for a second time to over 150 attendees.

Media 
 September 19, 2014: "Business School Case Tournaments: Why You Should Compete"
 January 30, 2013: "WMS students win place at international 24hr IT case comp"
 February 12, 2012: "Beedie School of Business" on CaseIT 2012 and the global presence in Vancouver 
 February 19, 2011: "Techvibes" on the strong showing of Canadian universities at CaseIT 2011
 May 11, 2010: "Business in Vancouver" on how CaseIT helped a competitor get his foot in the door with a career in IT
 April 19, 2010: "The Bocconi Online Newsmagazine" on the success of its students in CaseIT 2010
 April 8, 2010: "Beedie School of Business" on CaseIT and how it is planned
 February 2, 2009: "SFU Public Affairs and Media Relations" on the CaseIT 2009, Green IT
 June 11, 2008: "AsiaOne News" on the success of the team from Singapore Management University in CaseIT 2008

References

External links 
 CaseIT

Organizations based in British Columbia